The Umbilicariales are an order of lichenized fungi in the subclass Umbilicariomycetidae, class Lecanoromycetes. It contains five families: Elixiaceae, Fuscideaceae,  Ophioparmaceae, Ropalosporaceae, and Umbilicariaceae. Umbilicariales was proposed as a new order in 2007, while the subclass Umbilicariomycetidae was proposed in 2013.

Families and genera
, Species Fungorum accepts 5 families, 18 genera, and 107 species in the order Umbilicariales:

Elixiaceae
Elixia – 2 spp.
Meridianelia – 1 sp.

Fuscideaceae
Albemarlea – 1 sp.
Fuscidea – 31 spp.
Hueidea – 1 sp.
Lettauia – 2 sp.
Maronea – 2 spp.
Maronora – 1 sp.
Orphniospora – 2 spp.

Ophioparmaceae
Boreoplaca – 1 sp.
Hypocenomyce – 5 spp.
Ophioparma – 4 spp.
Rhizoplacopsis – 1 sp.

Ropalosporaceae
Ropalospora – 8 spp.

Umbilicariaceae
Fulgidea – 2 spp.
Lasallia – 5 spp.
Umbilicaria – 35 spp.
Xylopsora – 3 spp.

External links

Lichen orders
Lecanoromycetes orders
Taxa described in 2007